National Route 358 is a national highway of Japan connecting Fujikawaguchiko, Yamanashi and Kōfu, Yamanashi in Japan, with a total length of 28.5 km (17.71 mi).

References

National highways in Japan
Roads in Yamanashi Prefecture